The Government of Jharkhand also known as the State Government of Jharkhand, or locally as State Government, is the supreme governing authority of the Indian state of Jharkhand and its 24 districts.  It consists of an executive, led by the Governor of Jharkhand, a judiciary and a legislative branch.

Like other states of India, the head of state of Jharkhand is the Governor, appointed by the President of India on the advice of the central government. The post of governor is largely ceremonial. The Chief Minister is the head of government and is vested with most of the executive powers. Ranchi is the capital of Jharkhand, and houses the Vidhan Sabha (Legislative Assembly) and the secretariat.  The Jharkhand High Court, located in Ranchi, has jurisdiction over the whole state.

The present Legislative Assembly of Jharkhand is unicameral, consisting of 81 Member of the Legislative Assembly (M.L.A).  Its term is five years, unless dissolved earlier.

Departments of Jharkhand 

 Department of Personnel, Administrative Reforms and Rajbhasha(Jharkhand)
Department of Finance(Jharkhand)
Department of Planning and Development(Jharkhand)
Department of Cabinet Election(Jharkhand)
Department of Cabinet Secretariat and Vigilance (Jharkhand)
Department of Home, Jail and Disaster Management (Jharkhand)
Department of Information and Public Relations(Jharkhand)
Department of Information Technology and e-governance(Jharkhand)
Department of Excise and Prohibition (Jharkhand)
Department of Panchayati Raj (Jharkhand)
Department of Rural Development (Jharkhand)
Department of Rural Works (Jharkhand)
Department of Parliamentary Affairs (Jharkhand)
Department of Law(Jharkhand)
Department of Urban Development and Housing (Jharkhand)
Department of Energy (Jharkhand)
Department of Mines and Geology (Jharkhand)
Department of Transport (Jharkhand)
Department of Road Construction (Jharkhand)
Department of Building Construction (Jharkhand)
Department of Industries (Jharkhand)
Department of Commercial Taxes (Jharkhand)
Department of Water Resources (Jharkhand)
Department of Drinking Water and Sanitation (Jharkhand)
Department of Agriculture, Animal Husbandry and Cooperative (Jharkhand)
Department of Food, Public Distribution and Consumer Affairs (Jharkhand)
Department of Forest, Environment and Climate Change (Jharkhand)
Department of Tourism, Arts, Culture, Sports and Youth Affairs (Jharkhand)
Department of Women,Child Development and Social Security (Jharkhand)
Department of Health, Medical Education and Family Welfare (Jharkhand)
Department of School Education and Literacy Development ( Jharkhand)
Department of Higher and Technical Education (Jharkhand)
Department of Labour, Employment,Training and Skill Development (Jharkhand)
Department of Revenue, Registration and Land Reforms (Jharkhand)
Department of Scheduled Tribe, Scheduled Cast, Minority and Backward Class Welfare (Jharkhand)

See also
 Elections in Jharkhand
 List of Rajya Sabha members from Jharkhand
 Jharkhand Police
 Hemant Soren
Second Hemant Soren ministry

References

External links